Daniel Butler may refer to:

 Daniel Allen Butler (born 1957), American author, historian and playwright
 Dan Butler (born 1954), American actor
 Dan Butler (baseball) (born 1986), American professional baseball catcher
 Dan Butler (civil servant), American civil servant
 Daniel Butler (cyclist) (1944–1970), American Olympic cyclist
 Dan Butler (footballer, born 1994), English footballer for Peterborough United
 Dan Butler (Australian footballer) (born 1996), Australian rules football player
 Daniel Butler (minister) (1808–1893), American minister
 Dan B. Butler (1879–?), American football coach and mayor of Omaha, Nebraska
 Daniel Butler, host of television show America's Dumbest Criminals